Lanny Morgan (born March 30, 1934 in Des Moines, Iowa) is an American jazz alto saxophonist chiefly active on the West Coast jazz scene.

Morgan was raised in Los Angeles. In the 1950s he played with Charlie Barnet, Si Zentner, Terry Gibbs, and Bob Florence, then did a stint in the U.S. military, for which reason he had to turn down an offer to play in the orchestra of Stan Kenton. From 1960-65 he played in Maynard Ferguson's orchestra; after a few years in New York City he returned to Los Angeles in 1969, where he played frequently in the studios, was a member of Supersax, and played in the big bands of Bill Berry, Bob Florence, and Bill Holman.

Morgan also played on sessions for Nancy Sinatra.

Discography
 It's About Time (Palo Alto, 1982)
 The Lanny Morgan Quartet (VSOP, 1993)
 Pacific Standard (Contemporary, 1996)
 A Suite for Yardbird (Fresh Sound, 2002)

With Maynard Ferguson
 Let's Face the Music and Dance (Roulette, 1960)
 Maynard '61 (Roulette, 1961)
Double Exposure (Atlantic, 1961) with Chris Connor
Two's Company (Roulette, 1961) with Chris Connor
 "Straightaway" Jazz Themes (Roulette, 1961)
 Maynard '62 (Roulette, 1962)
Si! Si! M.F. (Roulette, 1962)
Maynard '63 (Roulette, 1962)
Message from Maynard (Roulette, 1962)
 Maynard '64 (Roulette 1959-62 [1963])
The New Sounds of Maynard Ferguson (Cameo, 1963)
Come Blow Your Horn (Cameo, 1963)
 Color Him Wild (Mainstream, 1965)
 The Blues Roar (Mainstream, 1965)
 The Maynard Ferguson Sextet (Mainstream, 1965)

With Carmen McRae
 Can't Hide Love (Blue Note, 1976)

References
Scott Yanow, [ Lanny Morgan] at Allmusic

American jazz saxophonists
American male saxophonists
West Coast jazz musicians
Musicians from Iowa
Palo Alto Records artists
Contemporary Records artists
Living people
1934 births
21st-century American saxophonists
21st-century American male musicians
American male jazz musicians
The Capp-Pierce Juggernaut members